Cybister sugillatus, is a species of predaceous diving beetle found in India, Sri Lanka, Afghanistan, Bhutan, Myanmar, Nepal, Pakistan, China, Indonesia, Japan, and Philippines.

References 

Dytiscidae
Insects of Sri Lanka
Insects described in 1834